Georgetown Day School (GDS) is an independent coeducational PK-12 school located in Washington, D.C. The school educates 1,075 elementary, middle, and high school students in northwestern Washington, D.C. Russell Shaw is the current Head of School.

Founded in 1945 as Washington's first racially integrated school, it is known for its progressive climate and dedication to social justice. Students call teachers by their first names, and the high school allows students to leave the campus during school hours.

The school has educated the children of several high-ranking government officials, including Justice Thurgood Marshall, Justice Ruth Bader Ginsburg, United States Attorney General Eric Holder, United States Assistant Attorney General Matthew G. Olsen, Treasury Secretary Larry Summers, Texas Senator Phil Gramm, Oregon Senator Ron Wyden, Florida Congressman Kendrick Meek, Maryland Congressman Jamie Raskin, Louisiana Senator Mary Landrieu., as well as Supreme Court Justice Ketanji Brown Jackson.

Georgetown Day recently finished construction on the new lower and middle school campus (2021), thereby unifying the high school and lower/middle school campuses. Both are now located in Tenleytown. The project raised over fifty-two million dollars from more than 2,000 donors, surpassing the fifty-million dollar fundraising goal.

Academics

As of 2022, Niche ranks Georgetown Day School as the best private high and K-12 school in the District of Columbia. Additionally, Niche ranks Georgetown Day as the ninth-best K-12 private school and the twenty-seventh best private high school nationally.

The school enrolls approximately 1,075 students and graduates about 130 seniors in any given year. As a college preparatory school, GDS sends 100% of its graduates to four-year universities. The mean SAT scores for the 2017 senior class at GDS were Math (700), Writing and Reading (720). The Class of 2018 included 8 National Merit Semifinalists, 27 Commended Students, and three National Hispanic Scholars.

Each year the school sponsors the Ben Cooper Lecture in memory of a student killed in a car accident in 1997.

Notable alumni

References

External links 
 

Educational institutions established in 1945
Private high schools in Washington, D.C.
Independent School League
Georgetown (Washington, D.C.)
Private elementary schools in Washington, D.C.
Private middle schools in Washington, D.C.
Preparatory schools in Washington, D.C.
1945 establishments in Washington, D.C.